The Cry of Dolores occurred in Dolores, Mexico, on 16 September 1810, when Roman Catholic priest Miguel Hidalgo y Costilla rang his church bell and gave the call to arms that triggered the Mexican War of Independence. The Cry of Dolores is most commonly known by the locals as "El Grito de Independencia" (The Independence Cry).

Every year on the eve of Independence Day, the President of Mexico re-enacts the cry from the balcony of the National Palace in Mexico City, while ringing the same bell Hidalgo used in 1810. During the patriotic speech, the president calls out the names of the fallen heroes who died during the War of Independence and he ends the speech by shouting Viva Mexico! three times followed by the Mexican National Anthem.

Historical event

In the 1810s, what would become Mexico was still New Spain, part of the Spanish crown. The independence movement began to take shape when José Bernardo Gutiérrez de Lara went to the small town of Dolores (now known as Dolores Hidalgo) and asked the local Roman Catholic priest, Miguel Hidalgo, to help initiate an effort to free New Spain from Spanish control.

Gutiérrez de Lara went to Washington, D.C. for military support (being the first Mexican to do so). Hidalgo remained in Dolores, waiting for Gutiérrez de Lara to return with military support. However, fearing arrest, Hidalgo told his brother Mauricio to make the sheriff free the pro-independence inmates there. Mauricio and armed men set 80 inmates free in the early morning hours of 16 September 1810. Around 2:30 a.m., Hidalgo ordered the church bells to be rung and gathered his congregation. Flanked by Ignacio Allende and Juan Aldama, he addressed the people in front of his church, urging them to revolt. His speech became known as the "Cry of Dolores".

The liberated country adopted Mexico as its official name. Mexico's independence from Spain took a decade of war. Gutiérrez de Lara commanded and led Mexico to victory. Independence was achieved by the Declaration of Independence of the Mexican Empire 11 years and 12 days later, on 28 September 1821. However, Hidalgo is credited as being the "father of his country".

Exact words and meaning
Scholars have not been able to reach a consensus on the exact words Miguel Hidalgo said at the time. Michael Meyer has noted: "The exact words of this most famous of all Mexican speeches are not known, or, rather, they are reproduced in almost as many variations as there are historians to reproduce them."

Meyer also argues that:

In contrast, William F. Cloud divides the sentiments above between Hidalgo and the crowd:

Many believe that Hidalgo's Grito condemned the notion of monarchy and criticized the current social order in detail. In fact, his opposition was targeted to Spain and its viceroy in Mexico: that is, not against the monarchy in general but against "bad government". The Grito also emphasized loyalty to the Catholic religion, a sentiment with which both Mexican-born Criollos and Peninsulares (native Spaniards) could sympathize. However, the strong anti-Spanish cry of "Death to Gachupines" (Gachupines being a slur given to Peninsulares) would have shocked Mexico's elites.

National festivities
The day of 16 September was first celebrated in 1812 in Huichapan, Hidalgo. It was given the status of a national holiday in the Constitution of Apatzingán, ratified by the conventions of 1822 and 1824, and first celebrated nationally in 1825.

The Cry of Dolores has assumed an almost mythical status. Since the late 20th century, the event has come to symbolize Mexican independence and to initiate Independence Day ceremonies the following day (16 September). Independence Day in Mexico is a patriotic holiday, marked by parades, concerts, patriotic programs, drum and bugle and marching band competitions, and special programs on the national and local media outlets.

Presidential celebration at Mexico City

Every 15 September at around 11 p.m., the President of Mexico stands on the balcony of the National Palace in Mexico City and rings the same bell that Hidalgo rang in 1810, which was moved to the National Palace. The President then recites a shout of patriotism (a Grito Mexicano) based upon the "Grito de Dolores", with the names of the important heroes of the Mexican War of Independence who were there on that historic day. The Grito ends with the threefold shout of ¡Viva México!

The Grito often differs slightly from year to year to reflect recent sentiments, or a preference by the President for a shorter or longer shout. This is the version often recited by the President of Mexico:

Spanish
 ¡Mexicanos!
 ¡Vivan los héroes que nos dieron patria!
 ¡Viva Hidalgo!
 ¡Viva Morelos!
 ¡Viva Josefa Ortiz de Domínguez!
 ¡Viva Allende!
 ¡Vivan Aldama y Matamoros!
 ¡Viva la Independencia Nacional!
 ¡Viva México! ¡Viva México! ¡Viva México!

 English
 Mexicans!
 Long live the heroes who gave us our homeland!
 Long live Hidalgo!
 Long live Morelos!
 Long live Josefa Ortiz de Domínguez!
 Long live Allende!
 Long live Aldama and Matamoros!
 Long live the nation's independence!
 Long Live Mexico! Long Live Mexico! Long Live Mexico!

Beneath the balcony of the National Palace, there is a large crowd in the Plaza de la Constitución (also called the Zócalo), to hear the recitation. The event draws up to half a million spectators from all over Mexico and tourists worldwide. After the President recites each line beginning with "¡Viva(n)!", the crowd responds by repeating, "¡Viva(n)!"

After the recitation, the President rings the bell one last time and waves the Flag of Mexico to the applause of the crowd.

This is followed by the playing of the Mexican national anthem by a military band from the Mexican Armed Forces, with the crowd singing along. The ceremonies conclude with a spectacular fireworks display at the Zócalo grounds.

On the morning of 16 September, or Independence Day, the national military parade in honor of the holiday starts in the Zócalo and its outskirts, passes the Hidalgo Memorial and ends on the Paseo de la Reforma, Mexico City’s main boulevard, passing "El Ángel de la Independencia" memorial column and other places along the way.

Recent exceptions

The Grito is not always re-enacted at the National Palace; some years it is performed in Dolores Hidalgo, Guanajuato, where it originally happened. This is especially common in the final year of a President's term.

President Felipe Calderón made an exception by re-enacting the Grito in Dolores Hidalgo as part of the bicentennial celebrations on 16 September 2010, even though he had already done so the night before from the National Palace balcony to launch the celebrations. As a result, in 2012, Calderón's final year as President, he did not go to Dolores Hidalgo but gave the Grito from the National Palace balcony instead. President Enrique Peña Nieto did not give the Grito in Dolores Hidalgo in any of his six years as President, becoming the fourth president to break the tradition.

Many presidents add their "personal touch" to the Grito and this can be controversial. President Vicente Fox frequently took liberties with it, adding and removing items, addressing Mexicans in both genders, and in 2001 wishing long life to "our agreements". Peña Nieto gave "vivas" to victims of recent earthquakes in 2017.

During Peña Nieto's presidency, the Grito became an occasion for political protest against him and his Institutional Revolutionary Party (PRI). On 15 September 2016, a month after the president appeared to be humiliated by U.S. Presidential candidate Donald Trump, thousands of citizens marched, yelled, and carried signs. They tried to enter the Zócalo during the Grito, but were blocked by a wall of soldiers. News outlets within Mexico failed to acknowledge the protest. The event was well-attended but opponents charge that the PRI brought acarreados (poor people or hand-picked party members) as a fake show of support.

The Grito was also disrupted in 2006 by a demonstration called the Plantón. Crowds loyal to losing candidate Andrés Manuel López Obrador protested alleged irregularities in the general election just concluded, and the Grito could not be delivered at the Zócalo but was spoken at the National Palace.  López Obrador won the presidency in 2018.

In 2020, the COVID-19 pandemic caused the Grito to be done remotely.

Celebrations by governors and municipal presidents

Similar celebrations to the Presidential one occur in cities and towns throughout Mexico, and in Mexican embassies and consulates worldwide on 15 or 16 September. The chief executive, ambassador, or consul rings a bell and recites the traditional words, including the names of independence heroes and local patriots, and ending with the threefold shout of Viva Mexico! The bell rings a second time, the Mexican flag is waved, and everyone sings the National Anthem, followed by fireworks. There are also celebrations in schools throughout Mexico, and in these cases whenever the bell ringing is reenacted the school or university head utters the traditional words. Celebrations also take place outside of Mexico, such as in U.S. states that have a large concentration of people of Mexican heritage who celebrate the holiday.

Notes

References

Further reading 

Sr. Antonio Barajas Becerra, "Entrada de los Insurgentes a la Villa de San Miguel El Grande, la tarde del Domingo, 16 de Septiembre de 1801."
Antonio Barajas Beccera, 1969, Generalisimo don Ignacio de Allende y Unzaga, 2a edicion, p. 108 ("a las cinco de la manana del domingo 16 de Septiembre, 1810").
Gloria Cisneros Lenoir, Miguel Guzman Peredo, 1985, Miguel Hidalgo y la Ruta de la Independencia, Bertelsmann de Mexico, p. 87.

External links 
Mexico connect.com: "El Grito" (The Cry) 
Bibliography and Hemerography: Miguel Hidalgo and Costilla.
Miguel Hidalgo and Costilla - Documents of 1810 and 1811.
Chronology of Miguel Hidalgo and Costilla
 Mexico Celebrates Its Bicentennial  - slideshow by Life magazine

Fiestas Patrias (Mexico)
Mexican War of Independence
1810 in New Spain
Battle cries
Colonial Mexico
History of Guanajuato
Independent Mexico
Mexico
Political catchphrases
September observances
September 1810 events